Weldon W. Edwards was an alderman, deputy sheriff, and  state legislator in Mississippi. He represented Warren County, Mississippi in the Mississippi House of Representatives from 1874 to 1877 and in 1882 and 1883.

Described as a quadroon in a contemporary newspaper report, he was educated by missionaries.

He testified about attacks on African American Republicans in Vicksburg, Mississippi during the 1875 election.

See also
African-American officeholders during and following the Reconstruction era

References

Republican Party members of the Mississippi House of Representatives
Year of birth missing
Mississippi city council members
19th-century American politicians
African-American politicians during the Reconstruction Era
People from Warren County, Mississippi